William Thornton (birth unknown – death unknown) was an English professional rugby league footballer who played in the 1930s and 1940s.

Playing career

International honours
Billy Thornton won a cap for England while at Hunslet in 1943 against Wales.

Championship final appearances
Billy Thornton played  in Hunslet's 8-2 victory over Leeds in the Championship Final during the  1937–38 season at Elland Road, Leeds on Saturday 30 April 1938.

County Cup Final appearances
Billy Thornton played  in the Hunslet FC's 7-13 defeat by Hull Kingston Rovers in the 1929–30 Yorkshire County Cup Final during the 1929–30 season at Headingley Rugby Stadium, Leeds on Saturday 30 November 1929, in front of a crowd of 11,000.

References

External links

England national rugby league team players
English rugby league players
Hunslet F.C. (1883) players
Place of birth missing
Place of death missing
Rugby league halfbacks
Year of birth missing
Year of death missing